Francis Talbot may refer to:

Francis Talbot, 5th Earl of Shrewsbury (1500–1560), son of George Talbot, 4th Earl of Shrewsbury and Anne Hastings
Francis Talbot, 11th Earl of Shrewsbury (1623–1668), English peer, second son of the 10th Earl of Shrewsbury
Francis X. Talbot (1889–1953), American Jesuit publisher and academic administrator
Manitonquat (1929–2018), Francis Talbot aka "Manitonquat" aka "Medicine Story", American New Age author and lecturer

See also
Frances Talbot (disambiguation)